Salimabad may refer to:
 Salimabad, Gilan
 Salimabad, Markazi
 Salimabad, Chalus, Mazandaran Province
 Salimabad, Tonekabon, Mazandaran Province
 Salimabad, Razavi Khorasan
 Salimabad, Sarbisheh, in South Khorasan Province
 Salimabad, Yazd

See also
 Salmabad (disambiguation)
 Salemabad (disambiguation)